Kay J. Christofferson is an American politician and a Republican member of the Utah House of Representatives representing District 56 since January 1, 2013.

Early life 
Christofferson was born in Lehi, Utah.

Education 
Christofferson earned his degree in civil engineering from Brigham Young University. He lists his occupation as a civil engineer with Horrocks Engineers.

Political career
2012 - When District 56 incumbent Republican Representative Ken Sumsion ran for Governor of Utah, Christofferson ran in the June 26, 2012 Republican primary, winning with 2,261 votes (58.8%), and won the November 6, 2012 general election with 11,921 votes (87.5%) against Democratic nominee Leslie Dalton.

2014 - Christofferson ran unopposed in both the Republican convention and the general election.

During the 2016 legislative session, he served on the Natural Resources, Agriculture, and Environmental Quality Appropriations Subcommittee, House Transportation Committee as well as the House Public Utilities and Technology Committee.

2016 sponsored legislation

Christofferson also floor sponsored SB0074S01 Aviation Amendments.

Personal life 
Christofferson is married and has seven children. Christofferson resides in Lehi, Utah.

References

External links
Official page at the Utah State Legislature
Campaign site

Kay Christofferson at Ballotpedia
Kay Christofferson at OpenSecrets

Place of birth missing (living people)
Year of birth missing (living people)
Living people
Brigham Young University alumni
Republican Party members of the Utah House of Representatives
People from Lehi, Utah
21st-century American politicians